He's All I've Got is the fourth studio album by Love Unlimited.

Track listing

1977 albums
Love Unlimited albums